Lars Knutson Liestøl (13 June 1839 – 15 December 1912) was a Norwegian politician.

Liestøl served on the district council of  Bygland in Aust-Agder, Norway over a 36-year period. He also was the municipal mayor for twelve years. He was a member of the Norwegian Parliament during various sessions between the periods 1874–1912. He served under the government of Prime Minister Johan Sverdrup as Minister of Auditing 1888–1889, as well as head of the Ministry of the Interior in 1888.

References

1839 births
1912 deaths
Government ministers of Norway
People from Åseral
Mayors of places in Norway